This article is a list of people from the island of Santiago, Cape Verde.  This is a list of people native to the island.  The list is ordered by current municipality.

Praia

David Hopffer Almada, politician, former Minister of Culture
Janira Hopffer Almada, politician
Ivan Almeida, basketball player
Patrick Andrade, footballer (soccer player)
António (Toni) Duarte, footballer
Lúcio Antunes, coach
Babanco, footballer
Ballack, footballer
Almir Barbosa, footballer
Jorge Barbosa, writer and poet
Gardénia Benrós, singer
Bijou, footballer
Alison Brito, footballer
Jorge Brito, vice-rector of the Jean Piaget University in Cape Verde
Calú (Carlos Lima), footballer
Cao, footballer currently living in Portugal
António Lopes Cardoso, Portuguese writer and poet
Pedro Cardoso, poet
Caló (Carlos Pedro Silva Morais), footballer
Louisa da Conceição, basketball player
Crispina Correia, basketball player
Mário Correia, basketball player
José Ulisses Correia e Silva, current Prime Minister of Cape Verde
Nuno da Costa, footballer
Adriano Tomás Custodio Mendes, footballer
Fufuco footballer
Dário Furtado, footballer
Djô footballer
Abílio Duarte, politician
Cristina Duarte, politician
Dulce Almada Duarte, linguist
Óscar Duarte, footballer currently living in Portugal
Vera Duarte, writer and politician
Mito Elias, writer and artist
Paulino do Livramento Évora, former bishop of Santiago de Cabo Verde
Gélson Fernandes, footballer
Vargas Fernandes, footballer
Manuel dos Santos Fernandes, footballer
Mário Fonseca, writer
Odaïr Fortes, footballer
Wullito Fernandes, footballer
Ondina Ferreira, former Minister of Education and Culture and Social Communications
Armando Freitas, footballer
José Emílio Furtado, footballer
Ricardo Jorge Pires Gomes, footballer
Jimmy Ines, footballer
José Rui, footballer
Júnior Monteiro, footballer
Kuca, footballer
Rosângela Lagos, basketball player
Cristina Fontes Lima, politician
Carlos Lisboa, basketball player and coach
Ildo Lobo, writer
Nelson Nunes Lobo, painter
Kiki Ballack (Luís Germano Pires Lopes de Almeida), footballer
Gelson Martins, footballer
Tuna Mascarenhas,  activist, medical laboratory scientist and second First Lady of Cape Verde
Mikoyam Tavares (nickname: Mikoyam), footballer
Orlando Monteiro, footballer currently living in São Tomé and Príncipe
Rui Monteiro, footballer
Nando, footballer
Nani, footballer
Neno, footballer
António Pedro, painter
Carlina Pereira, activist, politician and the inaugural First Lady of Cape Verde
Piguita, footballer
Zé Piguita footballer and manager
Platini (Luís Carlos Almada Soares), footballer
Fernando Quejas, singer
Nuno Miguel Monteiro Rocha, footballer
Márcio Rosa, footballer
Yara dos Santos, writer
Ronny Souto (nickname: Ronny), footballer
Samir (Hélder Lopes Semedo Fernandes), footballer
Jacinto Santos, politician, former mayor and head of the Democratic Renewal Party
Oscar Santos, politician, current president of the city
Sidney, footballer
Dany Silva, singer
José da Silva, railway worker, founder of Lusafrica record label company in France
Kevin Sousa, footballer
Stopira, footballer
Vadú, singer
Adilson Tavares Varela (better known as Cabral), footballer
Gilson Varela, footballer
Arménio Vieira, writer and poet
Vinha, footballer
Lela Violão, singer

Ribeira Grande de Santiago
André Álvares de Almada

Santa Catarina

Orlanda Amarílis, writer
Víctor Borges, former foreign minister
Jovane Cabral, footballer
João Baptista Freire, agronomist and former chamber president
Pedro Freire, professional judge
Arlindo Gomes Furtado, current bishop of Santiago de Cabo Verde
Danielson Gomes Monteiro, footballer
Gilyto, singer
Henrique Lubrano de Santa Rita Vieira, doctor
Suzanna Lubrano, singer
Maria Martins, athlete
Wania Monteiro, athlete
António Mascarenhas Monteiro, former President of Cape Verde, Statesman
Jose Maria Neves, former Prime Minister of Cape Verde, ex-Mayor of Santa Catarina
Ivone Ramos, writer
Gil Semedo, singer
Norberto Tavares, singer, performer, writer, producer
Tcheka or Txeca (Manuel Lopes Andrade), singer and songwriter
Toco (Fernando dos Reis Tavares), militant for the liberation of Cape Verde
Toni Varela, footballer
Anton Varela, municipal council
Manuel Veiga, writer
Vergolino Santos Vieira, businessman

Santa Cruz
Catchás (also as Katchás, original name: Carlos Alberto Martins), one of the Great Cape Verdean singers
Elida Almeida, singer
Nilson António, footballer
Thairo Costa, singer
Djaniny, footballer
Nha Nácia Gomes, singer
Lito (Cláudio Zélito Fonseca Fernandes Aguiar), footballer
Tino Santos, footballer

São Domingos
Codé di Dona, singer
Ano Nobo (Fulgěncio Tavares), singer
Silva Rosa, singer
Simplício Rodrigues de Sá, artist

São Lourenço dos Órgãos
Orlando Pantera, singer

São Miguel
Meno Fernandes, current mayor of the municipality of São Miguel
Nho Agostinho, former leader of the Rabelados movement
Moisés Lopes Pereira, current leader of the Rabelados movement in Espinho Branco
Teodoro Mendes Tavares, current bishop of a diocese in Brazil
Tchetcho, Rabelado painter

Tarrafal
Anilton César Varela da Silva, futsal player
Gracelino Barbosa, para-athlete
Blick Tchutchi, singer
Pedro Celestino SIlva Soares, footballer
Chando Graciosa, singer
Maruca Chica, singer
Beto Dias, singer
Silvino Lopes Évora, writer
Mário Lúcio, singer, member of Simentera band, writer, painter and Minister of Culture
Janício Martins, footballer
Princesito, singer
José Luís Tavares, poet

Locality not listed
Joaquim Manuel Andrade (Dr. Azágua) – académician, poet, kriolist
António Correia, footballer
Gegé, footballer
Kaoberdiano Dambarà, poet
Nilda Maria, politician
Adysângela Moniz, judoka
Eunice Silva, civil engineer and politician
Izé Teixeira, singer
Tuga (Álvaro Semedo Vaz), footballer

References

 
People